Istanbul attack may refer to the following:

Pre-21st century
 Occupation of the Ottoman Bank, in 1896
 Yıldız assassination attempt, in 1905
 Istanbul pogrom, in 1955 
 Taksim Square massacre, in 1977
 Beyazıt massacre, in 1978
 Neve Shalom Synagogue massacre, in 1986
 1999 Istanbul bombings (Shopping center, Bahçelievler district)
 Blue Market massacre

21st century

2000s
 January 2001 Istanbul bombing (Police station, Şişli)
 September 2001 Istanbul bombing (Beyoğlu district)
 2003 Istanbul bombings (synagogues, HSBC and British consulate)
 2004 attack on Istanbul restaurant (Kartal district)
 2004 Acıbadem bombing
 Assassination of Hrant Dink, in 2007
 2008 United States consulate in Istanbul attack
 2008 Istanbul bombings (Güngören district)
 2009 Istanbul bus attack

2010s
 2010 Istanbul bombing (Taksim Square)
 2012 Istanbul suicide bombing (Sultangazi district)

2015
 2015 Istanbul suicide bombing (Sultanahmet district)
 Istanbul Justice Palace siege
 2015 Istanbul metro bombing (Bayrampaşa district)
 2015 Sabiha Gökçen Airport bombing

2016
 January 2016 Istanbul bombing (Sultanahmet district)
 March 2016 Istanbul bombing (İstiklal Avenue)
 June 2016 Istanbul bombing (Vezneciler district)
 2016 Atatürk Airport attack
 October 2016 Istanbul bombing (Yenibosna district)
 December 2016 Istanbul bombings (Vodafone Arena)

2017-2019
 Istanbul nightclub shooting, in 2017 (Beşiktaş district)
 Assassination of Jamal Khashoggi, in 2018

2020s
 2022 Istanbul bombing (İstiklal Avenue)